Hryhoriy Misyutin (Ukrainian: Григорій Місютін ; born 29 December 1970) is a Ukrainian artistic gymnast, formerly representing the Soviet Union and the Unified Team.

External links
 

1970 births
Living people
People from Oleksandriia
Ukrainian male artistic gymnasts
Soviet male artistic gymnasts
Gymnasts at the 1992 Summer Olympics
Gymnasts at the 1996 Summer Olympics
Olympic gold medalists for the Unified Team
Olympic silver medalists for the Unified Team
Olympic gymnasts of the Unified Team
Olympic bronze medalists for Ukraine
Olympic gymnasts of Ukraine
Olympic medalists in gymnastics
Medalists at the 1996 Summer Olympics
Medalists at the 1992 Summer Olympics
Medalists at the World Artistic Gymnastics Championships
Sportspeople from Kirovohrad Oblast